Răzvad is a commune in Dâmbovița County, Muntenia, Romania with a population of 8,235 people. It is composed of three villages: Gorgota, Răzvad and Valea Voievozilor.

Natives
Radu Câmpeanu

References

Communes in Dâmbovița County
Localities in Muntenia
Place names of Slavic origin in Romania